Ornipholidotos josianae is a butterfly in the family Lycaenidae. It is found in southern Uganda. The habitat consists of forests.

References

Butterflies described in 2005
Taxa named by Michel Libert
Ornipholidotos
Endemic fauna of Uganda
Butterflies of Africa